Marie Antoinette is a 2006 historical drama film written and directed by Sofia Coppola. It is based on the life of Queen Marie Antoinette, played by Kirsten Dunst, in the years leading up to the French Revolution. It won the Academy Award for Best Costume Design. It was released in the United States on October 20, 2006, by Sony Pictures Releasing.

Plot
Fourteen-year-old Maria Antonia, the youngest daughter of Empress Maria-Theresa of Austria, is a beautiful, charming and naïve archduchess. In 1770, she is sent by her mother to marry Louis-Auguste, the Dauphin of France, to seal an alliance between the two rival countries. 

Maria, her name now changed to Marie Antoinette, travels to France, relinquishing all connections with her home country, and meets King Louis XV of France and her future husband, the Dauphin. The betrothed young couple arrive at the Palace of Versailles and are married at once. They are encouraged to produce an heir to the throne as soon as possible, but the next day it is reported to the king that "nothing happened" on the wedding night.

As time passes, Marie-Antoinette finds life at the court of Versailles stifling. Her husband's courtiers disdain her as a foreigner and blame her for not producing an heir, although the fault really lies with her husband, for the marriage remains unconsummated for an inordinate amount of time. The French court is rife with gossip, and Marie-Antoinette consistently ruffles feathers by defying its ritualistic formality. She instead spends much of her time with the few friends she has in Versailles, including the conservative Princesse de Lamballe and the flamboyant Duchess of Polignac.

Marie-Antoinette also refuses to meet or speak with Madame du Barry, the mistress of Louis XV. Over the years, Maria-Theresa continues to write to her daughter, giving advice on how to impress and seduce the Dauphin. Marie's attempts to consummate her marriage with her husband fail and they remain childless. Marie spends most of her time buying extravagant clothes and gambling. 

After a masquerade ball, Marie and Louis return to find the king dying of smallpox; he orders du Barry to leave Versailles. After the king's death, Marie-Antoinette's husband succeeds him as Louis XVI at the age of 19, and Marie-Antoinette becomes queen consort at age 18.

Marie-Antoinette's brother, Joseph II, Holy Roman Emperor, comes to visit, counseling her against her constant parties, advice that she finds easy to ignore. Joseph meets Louis XVI at the Royal Zoo and explains to him the "mechanics" of sexual intercourse in terms of "key-making", as one of the king's favorite hobbies is locksmithing. Thereafter, Louis and Marie Antoinette have sex for the first time, and in 1778, Marie Antoinette gives birth to a daughter, Marie Thérèse. 

As the child matures, Marie-Antoinette spends much of her time at the Petit Trianon, a small chateau in the park of Versailles. It is also at this time that she begins an affair with Axel Fersen. As France's financial crisis worsens, food shortages and riots increase, her public image deteriorates and her luxurious lifestyle and seeming indifference to the struggles of the French people earned her the name "Madame Deficit".

As the queen matures, Marie Antoinette focuses less on her social life and more on her family and makes what she considers to be significant financial adjustments. Her mother dies in 1780, and the following year she gives birth to a son, Louis-Joseph, Dauphin of France. She gives birth to another son, Louis-Charles, in 1785, and another daughter, Sophie, in 1786, who dies a month before her first birthday. 

As the French Revolution erupts with the storming of the Bastille, the royal family resolves to stay in France, unlike most of the court. Rioting Parisians force them to leave Versailles for Paris. The film ends with the royal family's transfer to the Tuileries. The last image is Marie-Antoinette's bedroom at Versailles, destroyed by angry rioters.

Cast

Production
The film was originally planned to be an adaptation of Évelyne Lever's Marie Antoinette: The Last Queen of France, a biography she wrote for American readers in 2000. Sofia Coppola bought the rights twice, but in the end she chose Antonia Fraser's biography, Marie Antoinette: The Journey instead of Lever's book, as the basis for her adaptation. The production was given unprecedented access to the Palace of Versailles. The film takes the same sympathetic view of Marie Antoinette's life as was presented in Antonia Fraser's biography. Coppola said the style for shooting was greatly influenced by the films of Stanley Kubrick, Terrence Malick, and Miloš Forman, as well as by Ken Russell's Lisztomania.

While the action happens in Versailles (including the Queen's Petit Trianon and the Hameau de la Reine) and the Paris Opera (which was built after the death of the real Marie Antoinette), some scenes were also shot in Vaux-le-Vicomte, Château de Chantilly, Hôtel de Soubise and at the Belvedere in Vienna.

Milena Canonero and six assistant designers created the gowns, hats, suits and prop costume pieces. Ten rental houses were also employed, and the wardrobe unit had seven transport drivers. Shoes were made by Manolo Blahnik and Pompei, and hundreds of wigs and hair pieces were made by Rocchetti & Rocchetti. As revealed in the "Making of" documentary on the DVD, the look of Count von Fersen was influenced by 1980s rock singer Adam Ant. Ladurée made the pastries for the film; its macarons are featured in a scene between Marie-Antoinette and Ambassador Mercy.

Soundtrack

The Marie Antoinette soundtrack contains new wave and post-punk bands New Order, Gang of Four, The Cure, Siouxsie and the Banshees, Bow Wow Wow, Adam and the Ants, the Strokes, Dustin O'Halloran and the Radio Dept. Some scenes utilise period music by Jean-Philippe Rameau, Antonio Vivaldi and François Couperin. The soundtrack also includes songs by electronic musicians Squarepusher and Aphex Twin.

Roger Neill served as a historic music consultant on the film.

Reception
In several 2006 interviews, Coppola suggests that her highly stylised interpretation was intentionally very modern in order to humanise the historical figures involved. She admitted taking great artistic liberties with the source material, and said that the film does not focus simply on historical facts – "It is not a lesson of history. It is an interpretation documented, but carried by my desire for covering the subject differently."

Marie Antoinette received both applause and some boos during early Cannes Film Festival press screenings, which one reviewer supposes was because some of the French journalists may have been offended that the film was not sufficiently critical of the regime's decadence. However, film critic Roger Ebert clarified that, in actuality, only a couple of journalists had been booing during the press screening, and that the media had sensationalised the event. He stated that booing is more common in Europe, and sometimes done when someone feels that a film is "politically incorrect".

Reception in the United States
Marie Antoinette polarized the critics, with reviews ranging from resounding praise to discerning criticism (mainly aimed at historical inaccuracies and a contemporary soundtrack). The film holds an approval rating of 57% on Rotten Tomatoes, which compiles mostly North American reviews, based on 215 reviews with an average rating of 6.10/10. The website's critics consensus states, "Lavish imagery and a daring soundtrack set this film apart from most period dramas; in fact, style completely takes precedence over plot and character development in Coppola's vision of the doomed queen." Metacritic gives the film a weighted average score of 65 out of 100, based on 37 critics, indicating "generally favorable reviews". Audiences polled by CinemaScore gave the film an average grade of "C" on an A+ to F scale.

People magazine's movie critic, Leah Rozen, wrote in her wrap-up of Cannes that, "The absence of political context ... upset most critics of Marie Antoinette, director Sofia Coppola's featherweight follow-up to Lost in Translation. Her historical biopic plays like a pop video, with Kirsten Dunst as the doomed 18th century French queen acting like a teenage flibbertigibbet intent on being the leader of the cool kids' club." Roger Ebert gave the film four stars out of four. He stated that, "every criticism I have read of this film would alter its fragile magic and reduce its romantic and tragic poignancy to the level of an instructional film. This is Sofia Coppola's third film centering on the loneliness of being female and surrounded by a world that knows how to use you but not how to value and understand you." The critic for MSN, Dave McCoy, described it as being a great satire, "I laughed, as I had been doing for the past twenty minutes. I was laughing at the satire, at Coppola's brash approach and from the pure joy that a great film can trigger."

Reception in France
The film's critical reception in France was generally positive. It has an aggregate score of 4/5 on the French cinema site AlloCiné, based on 21 reviews from professional critics. In the French trade journal, Le Film Francais, a third of the critics gave it their highest rating—"worthy of the Palme d'Or." Film critic Michel Ciment similarly rated it as worthy of the Palme d'Or.

Critics who gave the film positive reviews included Danielle Attali of Le Journal du Dimanche, who praised it as "a true wonder, with stunning colors, sensations, emotions, intelligence". François Vey of Le Parisien found it to be "funny, upbeat, impertinent" and "in a word, iconoclastic". Philippe Paumier of the French edition of Rolling Stone said that, "Transformed into a sanctuary for the senses, the microcosm of power becomes this moving drama of first emotions and Marie Antoinette, the most delicate of looks on adolescence". Frodon, editor of Les Cahiers du cinéma, praised Coppola for her genius' at portraying adolescent alienation."

Among negative critical reviews, Jean-Luc Douin of Le Monde described Marie Antoinette as "kitsch and roc(k)oco" which "deliberately displays its anachronisms", and additionally as a "sensory film" that was "dreamt by a Miss California" and "orchestrated around the Du Barry or Madame de Polignac playground gossip". Alex Masson of Score thought the film had a script "which is often forgotten to the corruption of becoming a special issue of Vogue devoted to scenes of Versailles".

French critics were annoyed with the loose portrayal of real historical events and figures in Marie Antoinette. Although it was filmed at Versailles, to capture the splendor of eighteenth-century royal life, some critics took issue with or did not understand why Coppola intermixed period music with contemporary music, for instance, using soundtracks by artists such as the Cure and the Strokes. Or why she intermixed modern products, such as Converse sneakers with formal period shoes. Although one historian explains that while they may be distracting, "they also convey the rebelliousness of a young woman, frustrated, bored, isolated, and yet always on display." An example of this combining of the actual period with modern times is a scene when Marie Antoinette and her friends enjoy a shopping spree and feast on luxurious sweets, champagne, clothing, shoes, and jewellery, to Bow Wow Wow's, "I Want Candy".

In the newspaper Le Figaro, historian Jean Tulard called the film "Versailles in Hollywood sauce", saying that it "dazzles" with a "deployment of wigs, fans and pastries, a symphony of colors" which "all [mask] some gross errors and voluntary anachronisms". In the magazine L'Internaute, Évelyne Lever, a historian and authority on Marie Antoinette, described the film as "far from historical reality". She wrote that the film's characterisation of Marie Antoinette lacked historical authenticity and psychological development: "In reality she did not spend her time eating pastries and drinking champagne! [...] In the movie Marie Antoinette is the same from 15 to 33 years". She also expressed the view that "better historical films" such as Barry Lyndon and The Madness of King George succeeded because their directors were "steeped in the culture of the time they evoked".

Coppola responded to the critics by explaining that she was interested in showing "the real human being behind the myths..."

Box office
In the United States and Canada, Marie Antoinette opened with $5,361,050 from 859 theatres, with an average of $6,241 per theatre. Nevertheless, the film quickly faded, grossing $15,962,471 in North America and $60,917,189 worldwide, against a production budget of $40 million. Marie Antoinette made $7,870,774 in France, where the film is set, but fared less well in the United Kingdom, where it took $1,727,858 at the box office, while the film's biggest international market was Japan, where it earned a total of $15,735,433.

Accolades

Home media release
The Region 1 and Region 2 DVD versions of Marie Antoinette were released in February 2007. Special features on the disc included a making-of featurette, two deleted scenes and a brief parody segment of MTV Cribs, featuring Jason Schwartzman as Louis XVI. No commentary was available for the DVD. In France, the double-disc edition included additional special features: Sofia Coppola's first short film, Lick the Star, and a BBC documentary on Marie Antoinette. A collector's edition boxset, entitled "Coffret Royal", was also released in France, and included the double-disc edition of the movie, Antonia Fraser's biography, photographs and a fan. The Japanese edition was released on July 19. This two-disc edition included the same extra features as the North American release, though it also included the American, European and Japanese theatrical trailers and Japanese TV spots. A limited-edition special Japanese boxed set contained the two disc DVD set, a jewellery box, a Swarovski high-heeled shoe brooch, a hand mirror, and a lace handkerchief.

Pathe Films released a Blu-ray version of Marie Antoinette on January 4, 2012, alongside Coppola's first film The Virgin Suicides exclusively in France. It ports over the previously released bonus features along with the previously released short film and documentary from the French DVD. While it is a region-free disc, the English-language track contains forced subtitles and the BBC documentary is not English-friendly.

A manufacture on demand Blu-ray was released through Sony's Choice Collection on October 6, 2016. This release, along with other Choice Collection releases, was strongly criticised for being a BD-R disc, which means it is a burnt disc instead of pressed, these discs are essentially a bootleg and a BD-R is more susceptible to damage and has a much shorter lifespan of about 10 years opposed to a pressed disc lasting for 100 years if properly cared for. Reviews were mixed of the Blu-ray video quality, with High Def Digest stating "Everything carries the unfocused blur of non-HD video".

Another Blu-ray of the film, unlike the first release that was sold online, was physically released by Mill Creek Entertainment on October 29, 2019 as part of a double feature set containing that and Kirsten Dunst's fellow film Little Women.

References

External links
 
 
 
 
 Translated interview with Sofia Coppola
 Screencaps

2006 films
2006 biographical drama films
2000s American films
2000s English-language films
2000s historical drama films
2000s Japanese films
American biographical drama films
American historical drama films
American Zoetrope films
Films about Marie Antoinette
Columbia Pictures films
Cultural depictions of Joseph II, Holy Roman Emperor
Cultural depictions of Louis XV
Cultural depictions of Madame du Barry
English-language French films
English-language Japanese films
Films about the upper class
Films based on biographies
Films directed by Sofia Coppola
Films scored by Dustin O'Halloran
Films set in the 1760s
Films set in 1770
Films set in 1778
Films set in 1780
Films set in 1785
Films set in 1786
Films set in Austria
Films set in country houses
Films set in France
Films shot at Pinewood Studios
Films shot in Paris
Films that won the Best Costume Design Academy Award
Films with screenplays by Sofia Coppola
French biographical drama films
French historical drama films
Japanese biographical drama films
Japanese historical drama films
Pathé films
Postmodern films
2000s French films